Bashkir Qa  or Bashkir Ka (Ҡ ҡ; italics: Ҡ ҡ) is a letter of the Cyrillic script. It is formed from the Cyrillic letter Ka (К к) with the top extending horizontally to the left. It is a letter corresponding to Қ in Siberian Tatar language.

It is used in the alphabet of the Bashkir language and Siberian Tatar language, where it represents the voiceless uvular plosive .

It is represented in the Arabic script as ق.

Computing codes

See also
Other Cyrillic letters used to write the sound :
Қ қ : Cyrillic letter Ka with descender
Ӄ ӄ : Cyrillic letter Ka with hook
Ԟ ԟ : Cyrillic letter Aleut Ka
Ԛ ԛ : Cyrillic letter Qa
Cyrillic characters in Unicode